Gabriel James Speier (born April 12, 1995) is an American professional baseball pitcher for the Seattle Mariners of Major League Baseball (MLB). He made his MLB debut in 2019 with the Kansas City Royals.

Career
Speier attended Dos Pueblos High School in Goleta, California.

Boston Red Sox
The Boston Red Sox selected Speier in the 19th round of the 2013 MLB draft and he signed.

After signing, Speier pitched four innings for the GCL Red Sox in 2013. He returned there in 2014 where he went 3-0 with a 1.55 ERA in nine games (six starts).

Detroit Tigers
On December 11, 2014, the Red Sox traded Speier with Yoenis Céspedes and Alex Wilson to the Detroit Tigers for Rick Porcello. He spent the 2015 season with the High-A West Michigan Whitecaps where he compiled a 4-2 record and 2.86 ERA in 33 relief appearances.

Atlanta Braves
On November 20, 2015, the Tigers traded Speier and Ian Krol to the Atlanta Braves for Cameron Maybin.

Arizona Diamondbacks
He was then traded again on December 9, 2015; the Braves traded him and Shelby Miller to the Arizona Diamondbacks in exchange for Dansby Swanson, Ender Inciarte, and Aaron Blair. He spent 2016 with the Kane County Cougars, AZL Diamondbacks, Visalia Rawhide, and Mobile BayBears, pitching to a combined 4-2 record, 2.62 ERA, and 1.20 WHIP in 39 appearances out of the bullpen. In 2017, he pitched for the Jackson Generals, collecting a 2-6 record and 4.30 ERA in 69 innings pitched.

Kansas City Royals
On June 6, 2018, the Diamondbacks traded Speier and Elvis Luciano to the Kansas City Royals for Jon Jay. He was then assigned to the Northwest Arkansas Naturals. In 46 relief appearances between the two teams, he went 1-0 with a 3.39 ERA. He began the 2019 season with Northwest Arkansas before being promoted to the Omaha Storm Chasers.

On September 3, 2019, the Royals selected Speier's contract and promoted him to the major leagues. He made his major league debut on September 5 versus the Detroit Tigers, pitching a scoreless inning in relief.

With the 2020 Kansas City Royals, Speier appeared in 8 games, compiling a 0-1 record with 7.94 ERA and 6 strikeouts in 5.2 innings pitched. On November 20, 2020, Speier was designated for assignment.

Speier was assigned to Triple-A Omaha to begin the 2021 season. While there, he pitched in 45 games, going 3-0 with a 2.98 ERA with 57 strikeouts.
On September 15, 2021, Speier's contract was selected by the Royals.

Seattle Mariners
On November 9, 2022, Speier was claimed off waivers by the Seattle Mariners.

Personal life
Speier is the nephew of former MLB infielder Chris Speier and the cousin of former pitcher Justin Speier.

References

External links

1995 births
Living people
Sportspeople from Santa Barbara, California
Baseball players from California
Major League Baseball pitchers
Kansas City Royals players
Gulf Coast Red Sox players
West Michigan Whitecaps players
Arizona League Diamondbacks players
Kane County Cougars players
Visalia Rawhide players
Mobile BayBears players
Jackson Generals (Southern League) players
Northwest Arkansas Naturals players
Omaha Storm Chasers players
Salt River Rafters players